Michel Las Vergnas (11 January 1941 – 19 January 2013) was a French mathematician associated with Pierre-and-Marie-Curie University in Paris, and a research director emeritus at the Centre national de la recherche scientifique.

Las Vergnas earned his Ph.D. in 1972 from Pierre-and-Marie-Curie University, under the supervision of Claude Berge. He was one of the founders of the European Journal of Combinatorics, which began publishing in 1980.

His initial research was in graph theory, and particularly in the theories of matching and connectivity. Beginning in 1975, he became one of the pioneers of the theory of oriented matroids, and since that time he was interested in connections between combinatorics and geometry.

A workshop on combinatorial geometry, held in Marseilles in April 2013, was dedicated to his memory.

References

1941 births
2013 deaths
20th-century French mathematicians
21st-century French mathematicians
Pierre and Marie Curie University alumni
Academic staff of the University of Paris
Combinatorialists
Graph theorists